Circanota is a genus of moths belonging to the subfamily Tortricinae of the family Tortricidae.

Species
Circanota undulata Brown, 2014
Circanota simplex Brown, 2014

Etymology
The generic name is derived from Latin circum (meaning around) and nota (meaning mark).

See also
List of Tortricidae genera

References

Sparganothini